Cecidoses eremita is a moth of the family Cecidosidae. It was described by John Curtis in 1835. It is found in South America, including Uruguay and Argentina.

The larvae feed on Schinus dependens. They create galls.

References

Moths described in 1835
Cecidosidae